The Julien Baker and Phoebe Bridgers with Lucy Dacus Tour was a co-headlining concert tour with indie rock musicians Julien Baker, Phoebe Bridgers, and Lucy Dacus, collectively known as Boygenius.

Background
In 2016, Phoebe Bridgers opened for Julien Baker on some of her tour. Lucy Dacus also opened for Baker on a handful of tour dates that same year. Being friends with both individuals, this ultimately led to Baker introducing Dacus to Bridgers, and meeting for the first time in 2018. The trio had booked the tour before recording any music. After it had been booked, they originally planned to record one 7", to promote the tour. However, once together in the studio together they ended up recording six songs, which became their self-titled EP. For the tour, each artist performed a solo set of material before all three joined each other at the end to perform the full boygenius EP.

Set lists
These set lists are representative of the show in Chicago, Illinois on November 13, 2021. They are not representative of all concerts for the duration of the tour.

boygenius

 Souvenir 
 Bite the Hand
 Stay Down
 Me & My Dog
 Salt in the Wound
 Ketchum, ID

Julien Baker

 Sour Breath
 Shadowboxing
 Sprained Ankle
 Everybody Does
 Rejoice
 Televangelist
 Hurt Less
 Go Home
 Something
 Turn Out the Lights
 Appointments

Phoebe Bridgers

 Smoke Signals
 Funeral
 Georgia 
 Demi Moore
 Killer
 Scott Street
 Motion Sickness
 You Missed My Heart

Lucy Dacus

 Fool's Gold
 Addictions
 Nonbeliever
 Yours & Mine
 Pillar of Truth
 I Don't Wanna Be Funny Anymore
 Night Shift

Tour dates

References

2018 concert tours
Phoebe Bridgers concert tours